Charles Dewayne Freeman (born September 1, 1955) is an American politician. Rising to president pro tempore of the Alabama Senate, he ran for Lieutenant Governor of Alabama in 1998 but lost fellow senator Steve Windom. He was appointed by Don Siegelman as Director of the Alabama Department of Economic and Community Affairs but resigned in 2000 after being arrested for domestic violence.

References

External links

1951 births
Living people
Alabama Democrats
Alabama state senators
20th-century American politicians
21st-century American politicians